Pyrausta acrobasella is a moth in the family Crambidae. It was described by Rebel in 1915.

References

Moths described in 1915
acrobasella